Juriques is a stratovolcano on the border between Bolivia and Chile. It is located immediately southeast of Licancabur volcano. Laguna Verde lies at the foot of this volcano.

Gallery

References

Volcanoes of Antofagasta Region
Volcanoes of Potosí Department
Stratovolcanoes of Chile
Stratovolcanoes of Bolivia
Polygenetic volcanoes
Five-thousanders of the Andes
International mountains of South America
Holocene stratovolcanoes